Immortal Coil is a Star Trek: The Next Generation novel written by Jeffrey Lang, published by Pocket Books in February 2002. The novel focuses on the character Data, investigating an incident at Starfleet. The novel takes place in the 24th century of the Star Trek Universe.

Story
When a newly developed android developed by Starfleet is destroyed, Lieutenant Commander Data helps investigate the incident and who is responsible. During the course of his search he discovers he is not as unique as he once believed.

During the run of the original Star Trek series many other robots and androids were seen, yet Data is often referred to as the only android in existence during the time of Star Trek: The Next Generation.  Immortal Coil explains what happened to those other robots and androids, and how Data fits into their histories.  The story references several previously-seen artificial intelligences and characters:

 Exocomps from the TNG episode "The Quality of Life"
 Androids from the TOS episode "What Are Little Girls Made Of?"
 The M5 computer from the TOS episode "The Ultimate Computer"
 Flint and Reyna from the TOS episode "Requiem for Methuselah"
 Doctor Ira Graves from the TNG episode "The Schizoid Man"
 Commander Bruce Maddox from the TNG episode "The Measure of a Man"
 Dr. Noonien Soong, Data's creator, first seen in the TNG episode "Brothers"

See also
List of Star Trek: The Next Generation novels
List of Star Trek novels

References

External links

2002 American novels
Novels based on Star Trek: The Next Generation
Pocket Books books